
Year 138 BC was a year of the pre-Julian Roman calendar. At the time it was known as the Year of the Consulship of Serapio and Callaicus (or, less frequently, year 616 Ab urbe condita) and the Third Year of Jianyuan. The denomination 138 BC for this year has been used since the early medieval period, when the Anno Domini calendar era became the prevalent method in Europe for naming years.

Events 
 By place 
Roman Empire
 Tautalus surrenders to the Romans.
 Valencia in Spain is founded as a Roman colony.

Asia Minor
 Attalus III succeeds Attalus II as Attalid king of Pergamon
Egypt
 Galaestes revolts.

Syria
 Antiochus VII expels Diodotus Tryphon.
 Tryphon sacks Beirut

 Parthia 
 Phraates II becomes emperor of Parthia.

 China
 Grand Empress Dowager Dou, the grandmother of Emperor Wu of Han, purges the high administration of officials to consolidate her power. Among those dismissed are Prime Minister Dou Yong and her own half-brother, the General-in-Chief Tian Fen. Two of the young emperor's closest advisors, Zhao Wan and Wang Zang, are arrested and commit suicide.

 By topic 
 Arts and sciences 
 Hymn to Apollo is written and inscribed on stone in Delphi; it is the earliest surviving notated music, in a substantial and legible fragment, in the western world.

Births 
 Lucius Cornelius Sulla, Roman general and statesman (d. 78 BC)
 Phaedrus the Epicurean, Greek scholar and philosopher

Deaths 
 Attalus II Philadelphus, king of Pergamon (b. 220 BC)
 Diodotus Tryphon, king of the Seleucid Empire
 Mithridates I, king of Parthia (b. c. 195 BC)

References